Corded quilting (also known as Marseilles quilting, Marseilles embroidery, marcella, or Zaans stitchwork) is a decorative quilting technique popular from the late 17th through the early 19th centuries. In corded quilting, a fine fabric, sometimes colored silk but more often white linen or cotton, is backed with a loosely woven fabric.  Floral or other motifs are outlined in parallel rows of running stitches or backstitches to form channels, and soft cotton cord is inserted through the backing fabric using a blunt needle and drawn along the quilted channels to produce a raised effect.  Tiny quilting stitches in closely spaced rows fill the motifs and provide contrast to the corded outlines.

Corded quilting was popular for dresses, petticoats, and waistcoats as well as curtains and bedcoverings.  Originating in the fine whole-cloth quilt tradition of Provence in southern France, corded quilting differs from the related trapunto quilting in which loose wadding or batting rather than cord is inserted to create raised designs.  By the Federal era in America, corded quilting and trapunto were combined with whitework embroidery and other needlework techniques to produce a profusion of white-on-white textiles for the home before the fashion faded.

The principal areas of production using this technique were southern France and Italy.

Notes

References

Takeda, Sharon Sadako, and Kaye Durland Spilker, Fashioning Fashion: European Dress in Detail, 1700 - 1915, LACMA/Prestel USA (2010), 
Weissman, Judith Reiter and Wendy Lavitt: Labors of Love: America's Textiles and Needlework, 1650-1930, New York, Wings Books, 1987, 

Quilting
Embroidery